Genycharax tarpon is a species of characin endemic to Colombia, where it is found in the upper Rio Cauca.  It is the only member of its genus.

References
 

Characidae
Monotypic fish genera
Taxa named by Carl H. Eigenmann
Endemic fauna of Colombia
Freshwater fish of Colombia
Fish described in 1912